Elisabeth Raudaschl (born 7 November 1997) is an Austrian ski jumper who has competed at World Cup level since the 2013/14 season.

Career
Raudaschl's best individual result is 14th place in Lillehammer on 4 December 2015; her best team result is 6th place in Hinterzarten on 16 December 2017, in what was the first ever women's World Cup team competition. At the Junior World Championships, she won an individual silver medal in 2015, and team bronze in 2017. She also won a mixed team bronze at the 2013 European Youth Olympic Winter Festival.

References

1997 births
Living people
Austrian female ski jumpers